Brian Broughton may refer to:

Brian Broughton, see 2006 New Year Honours
Sir Brian Broughton, 1st Baronet (1618–1708), of the Broughton baronets
Sir Brian Broughton, 3rd Baronet (died 1724), MP for Newcastle-under-Lyme
Sir Brian Broughton-Delves, 4th Baronet (1717–1744), of the Broughton baronets, MP for (Much) Wenlock

See also
Broughton (surname)